Sverre Parelius Riisnæs (6 November 1897 - 21 June 1988) was a Norwegian jurist and public prosecutor. He was a member of the collaborationist government Nasjonal Samling in occupied Norway during World War II and a Standartenführer (Colonel) in the Schutzstaffel.

Pre-war career

Riisnæs was an important public prosecutor in inter-war Norway, and had contacts in the international policing community. He is credited with introducing new investigative techniques, such as the use of police dogs, to Norway. Riisnæs was the public prosecutor in the famous case against Per Imerslund and other Norwegian Nazis who had broken into the home where Leon Trotsky had been staying before his deportation from Norway to Mexico.

He was a supporter of Adolf Hitler, but broke all contact with his German friends when he was appointed by Parliament in January 1940 to investigate German espionage in Norway.

Wartime collaborationist minister
He was appointed councillor of state in the Nasjonal Samling (NS) government 1940–1941, and was one of nine Norwegians signing the declaration on 31 January 1942 which disbanded the Parliament of Norway and directed Quisling to formally take over the powers of government. He served as the Minister of Justice from 1941 to 1945. As Minister of Justice, Riisnæs was responsible for changing the Norwegian legal system to legitimise the Nazi actions, and authorized the persecution of those who would not cooperate with the German occupiers. Riisnæs held public speeches against Norwegian Jews.

After World War II
After collapse of the Quisling government at the end of the war, Jonas Lie, Henrik Rogstad and Riisnæs retreated to an NS gathering place outside of Oslo. Surrounded by the Home Front guard forces, Lie died probably of natural causes and Rogstad committed suicide. Riisnæs surrendered without a struggle.

After the war he was charged with treason, but his trial was suspended based on the defence that he was mentally ill. Riisnæs was hospitalized for this illness in the Reitgjerdet Hospital from 1948 to 1960. In 1974 he emigrated to Sicily, Italy, and later to Vienna, but returned to Oslo in 1985, where he lived for three years in a nursing home until his death. To this day, there are questions whether he feigned mental weakness.

Literature
 N.J. Ringdal, Gal mann til rett tid: NS-minister Sverre Riisnæs, en psykobiografi (Oslo: Aschehoug, 1989)

References and notes

1897 births
1988 deaths
Members of Nasjonal Samling
SS-Standartenführer
Norwegian Waffen-SS personnel
Norwegian anti-communists
Norwegian emigrants to Italy
Norwegian emigrants to Austria
Norwegian prisoners and detainees
Ministers of Justice of Norway
People from Vik
Prisoners and detainees of Norway